"Pieces of Ice" is a song written by Marc Jordan and John Capek and recorded by American singer Diana Ross. It was produced by Gary Katz, and was released on June 17, 1983 as the first single from the singer's self-titled Ross album. It was the only simultaneous top forty single the singer scored on this album, which was one of her rare misses on RCA Records in the early 1980s. In the US, the song reached #31 on the Billboard Hot 100 chart and #15 on the soul singles chart. In Europe, "Pieces of Ice" peaked at #46 in the UK, and it charted best in Norway, where it reached #8. The song was released in three different version lengths: a 7-inch version at 3:57, an album version at 4:58, and the 12-inch version at 7:19. The US-released 12-inch single also includes an instrumental version as its B-side.

Music video
The accompanying music video for "Pieces of Ice" was the first to feature Bob Giraldi as director; he would direct several Ross videos during this period, and features Ross in a slithery red bodysuit. It was also the first video that showcased choreography in Ross' videos.

Personnel
Diana Ross − lead vocals
Gary Katz − producer
Joe Walsh − guitar
Larry Carlton − guitar
Jeff Porcaro − drums
Greg Phillinganes − keyboards, keyboard bass
Jim Horn − saxophone, flute

Charts

Influence 
The song heavily influenced the theme and title of American children’s author Timothy Bellavia‘s Young Adult graphic novel. Bellavia's book with the same title was nominated for Outstanding LGTBQ Memoir  at the Lambda Literary Foundation Award in 2009.

References

1983 singles
Diana Ross songs
American new wave songs
Post-disco songs
Music videos directed by Bob Giraldi
1983 songs
1982 songs
Dance-pop songs
Songs written by John Capek
Songs written by Marc Jordan
RCA Records singles
Song recordings produced by Gary Katz 
 Pieces of Ice